|}

The Gala Stakes is a Listed flat horse race in Great Britain open to horses aged three years and over.
It is run at Sandown Park over a distance of 1 mile 1 furlongs and 209 yards (2,002 metres), and it is scheduled to take place each year in July.
The race was first run in 2002.

Records
Leading jockey since 2002 (3 wins):
 Richard Hills – Izdiham (2002), Ikhtyar (2003), David Junior (2005)

Leading trainer since 2002 (4 wins):
 Saeed bin Suroor – Kirklees (2009), Windhoek (2014), Tha'ir (2015), Passion and Glory (2022)

Winners

See also
 Horse racing in Great Britain
 List of British flat horse races

References

Racing Post:

Flat races in Great Britain
Sandown Park Racecourse
Open middle distance horse races